Dmitry Yevgenyevich Popko (born 24 October 1996) is a Russian-born Kazakhstani tennis player.

Popko has a career high ATP singles ranking of World No. 162 achieved on 25 October 2021. He also has a career high ATP doubles ranking of World No. 304 achieved on 1 May 2017.

Popko has participated in qualifying for all four of the Grand Slams.

Popko represents Kazakhstan at the Davis Cup. He defeated Chinese tennis player Zhang Ze in his first tie.

Challenger and Futures/World Tennis Tour finals

Singles: 28 (19–9)

Doubles: 11 (5–6)

References

External links

1996 births
Living people
Kazakhstani male tennis players
Russian male tennis players
Sportspeople from Astana
Sportspeople from Saint Petersburg
Naturalised citizens of Kazakhstan
Naturalised tennis players
Kazakhstani people of Russian descent